Montrose is the debut studio album by American hard rock band Montrose, released in October 1973. It was produced by Ted Templeman and released by Warner Bros. Montrose marks the career debut of vocalist Sammy Hagar, who would later achieve commercial success as a solo artist and as a member of the hard rock band Van Halen.

History
Montrose was guitarist Ronnie Montrose's first record leading his own band, after having done session work for various musicians, including Van Morrison, Herbie Hancock and Edgar Winter. The band included Denny Carmassi (drums), Bill Church (bass), and a then-unknown Sammy Hagar (vocals). Ronnie Montrose mainly used a Gibson Les Paul, a Fender Bandmaster amp, and a Big Muff fuzzbox by Electro-Harmonix in recording the album.

The album was not successful upon release, peaking at No. 133 on the US Billboard 200. "Rock Candy" and "Bad Motor Scooter" were the only tracks to receive radio airplay. It has been reported that the band's label, Warner Bros., did not know how to market Montrose, already having the Doobie Brothers and Deep Purple to cover the rock genres, saw the band as something of a redundancy on their roster of artists. In 1974, the album was issued in Europe via Germany under the title Rock the Nation. This release duplicated the track listing of the U.S. album, but had a different front sleeve image, replacing the band's photo with that of a large-busted blonde girl sporting a pink see-through blouse. Montrose eventually proved to be an international sleeper hit, selling in excess of one million copies and attaining platinum status in 1986.

Some critics have arguably labeled it the "first American heavy metal album". Often being cited as "America's answer to Led Zeppelin", it is held to be influential among hard rock and heavy metal musicians.

Montrose was voted as the 4th best Metal Album of All Time by Kerrang! magazine in 1989. That same year, Hit Parader named it within the Top 100 Heavy Metal albums of all time.

Legacy
 English heavy metal band Iron Maiden recorded "Space Station #5" as B-side of the single "Be Quick or Be Dead" in 1992.
 "Make It Last" was covered by Van Halen in their early club days (available on Van Halen bootlegs).

Track listing
Credits adapted from the album liner notes.

Montrose (2017 re-release bonus)
On October 13, 2017, Rhino Entertainment released a Deluxe Edition. The first six tracks are demos from the album's recordings. The remaining are from the group's debut performance, a session on KSAN radio from the Record Plant in Sausalito, California on April 21, 1973.

Personnel
All credits adapted from the original release. Only the mastering credits are from the 2005 Audio Fidelity release.

Montrose 
 Sammy Hagar – vocals
 Ronnie Montrose – guitar
 Bill Church – bass 
 Denny Carmassi – drums

Production 
 Ted Templeman – producer
 Donn Landee – engineer
 Stephen Jarvis – engineer (guitar overdubs)
 Steve Hoffman – mastering

References

Further reading

Montrose (band) albums
1973 debut albums
Albums produced by Ted Templeman
Warner Records albums